Pepsi Max (also known as Pepsi Black in some countries) is a low-calorie, sugar-free cola, marketed by PepsiCo as an alternative to Pepsi and Diet Pepsi. Pepsi Max is still available primarily in Asian and European markets.  While Pepsi Max was released in April 1993, it was first available on store shelves in the United States in 2007.

A drink with the same name but different formulation (containing ginseng and higher quantities of caffeine) was sold in the United States until it was renamed "Pepsi Zero Sugar" in late 2016.

History

Pepsi Max debuted in Australia, the United Kingdom, and Italy in April 1993. The rollout was expanded to Ireland the following September, and to France, Greece, Spain, Portugal, and the Netherlands the following December. By the end of 1994, Pepsi Max was sold in approximately twenty countries. By the end of 1995, that figure had more than doubled. The product remained unavailable in the United States until 2006 (the US, PepsiCo's home market, and the largest consumer of carbonated soft drinks), where one of its principal ingredients had not yet been approved by the Food and Drug Administration. The ingredient—acesulfame potassium—is combined with aspartame to provide the beverage's sweetness, whereas some other diet colas are sweetened by aspartame alone.

In early-2005, Pepsi Max Twist (with added lemon-lime flavour) joined the UK and Australian product line. In autumn 2005, "Pepsi Max Punch" was marketed in the UK for the festive season. Containing ginger and cinnamon, the product was similar in flavour to Pepsi Holiday Spice, a sugar-sweetened variety of Pepsi that was marketed in the US one year earlier. In late-2005 and early-2006, a coffee-flavoured variety was introduced in France, Finland, Ireland, Norway, and the UK. Known as "Pepsi Max Cappuccino" ("Pepsi Max Coffee Cino" in the UK), the product was prefigured by the similar Pepsi Kona (briefly test-marketed in the US in 1996) and Pepsi Tarik, available in Malaysia since 2005.

Pepsi Max was introduced to South Korea, Bulgaria, and the Philippines in 2006, as well as being reintroduced into Argentina in the spring of 2006 after being phased out after its launch in 1994. As well as this, Pepsi Max was introduced into Brazil, Egypt, Jordan, Lebanon, Turkey and the United Arab Emirates during early 2007.

In October 2008, Pepsi announced it would be redesigning its logo and re-branding many of its products. Pepsi, Diet Pepsi, and Pepsi Max all use lower-case fonts for name brands, Mountain Dew was renamed "Mtn Dew", and Diet Pepsi Max was re-branded as Pepsi Max. The brand's blue and red globe trademark became a series of "smiles", with the central white band arcing at different angles depending on the product. The new imagery is being used. In the case of Pepsi Max, besides renaming of the drink its international name, the logo has a large "smile" likely to emphasize the North American drink's "Wake up people!" advertising campaign, and also uses black in the bottom half of the globe as opposed to the more standard royal blue. The new lower-case font used on Pepsi's products is reminiscent of the font used in Diet Pepsi's logo from the 1960s to the mid-1980s. The website for the "Wake up people!" campaign now redirects to the Pepsi Refresh Project. It is expected that the version of Pepsi Max outside North America will adopt the new logo used by its US–Canada counterpart; this has now occurred in Australia. In the UK, the cans now have the "Pepsi" text and the new Pepsi globe (with the normal Pepsi "smile" and the blue bottom half, as opposed to the black half used in the US) but the "Max" is in the previous style.

A Pepsi Max Lime version was released in the United States in February 2010 under the name "Pepsi Max Cease Fire" It was introduced in the UK in late-2011. It was cross-promoted with a new flavor series of Doritos chips called "3rd Degree Burn". In July 2010, Pepsi began to move its North American branding for Pepsi Max to match its global branding. It now carries a Max typography similar to that used worldwide, and rolled out a new slogan: "Zero Calories. Maximum Pepsi Taste". Its formula has not changed. In May 2011, Pepsi introduced the drink to Spain. In 2016, the drink was introduced to Venezuela. In 2017 Pepsi Max was launched in Costa Rica

In 2013, Pepsi Max collaborated with English magician Steven Frayne, also known as Dynamo, as part of their 'Live for Now' campaign which was launched the previous year. As part of a launch event, Dynamo was seen in London hanging from the side of a number 543 double-decker bus on its journey along Millbank, past the Houses of Parliament and across Westminster Bridge, while hundreds of passers by watched. The partnership also saw Dynamo appear in an on-pack promotion on cans and bottles of Pepsi Max during July and August, and secured 19 million unique impressions & 7 million total video views on social media.

In 2017, the drink was reintroduced in Belarus, the Czech Republic, Greece, Hungary, India, Slovakia, Slovenia and Ukraine as Pepsi Black. As of 2017 it is available as Pepsi Max in Albania, Australia, Austria, Belgium, Bosnia and Herzegovina, China, Croatia, Denmark, Estonia, Finland, France, Germany, Italy, Iceland, Ireland, Liechtenstein, Luxembourg, Macedonia, Moldova, Montenegro, the Netherlands, New Zealand, Norway, the Philippines, Poland, Portugal, Romania, Russia, Serbia, Spain, Sweden, Switzerland, Thailand, Turkey, the United Kingdom and Venezuela.

Product positioning
Recent UK/Australia Pepsi Max television advertisements have featured the taglines "Maximum taste, no sugar" and "Don't worry, there's no sugar." Some have incorporated extreme sports as well as video games such as Motocross Mania in an attempt to appeal to young men (in contrast to other diet cola drinks, which tend to target young women). The British advertising campaign involved retouched versions of the American "Do the Dew" commercials for Mountain Dew (A variant of which is sold in the UK), rebranded as "Live life to the Max".

Coca-Cola Zero, a sugar-free cola from The Coca-Cola Company, is marketed in a similar manner. In the UK, some Coke Zero advertising alluded to Pepsi Max, leading to a counter-campaign by Pepsi extolling the virtues of the concept of "maximum" over that of "zero".

Variants

In early-2005, the North American drink Pepsi ONE was revised, with Splenda brand sucralose replacing the aspartame ingredient.

Canadian formulation
Beginning in early 1994, an entirely different Pepsi Max was marketed in Canada. Now regarded as a precursor to Pepsi Edge, it was sweetened with a combination of aspartame and high fructose corn syrup. As a result, it contained two-thirds fewer calories than full-sugar colas (including regular Pepsi), but more calories than conventional diet/light colas (or the version of Pepsi Max sold elsewhere). The Canadian product was discontinued in 2002; the Diet Pepsi Max product introduced in 2008 has no direct relationship to the earlier formulation.

See also
List of Pepsi variations

Further reading
Kotabe, M. and Helsen, K. Global Marketing Management, John Wiley & Sons, 2004.

References

External links

PepsiCo cola brands
Diet drinks
Products introduced in 1993
Caffeinated soft drinks